Lashenden Air Warfare Museum is an aviation museum at Lashenden (Headcorn) Airfield in Kent in southeast England.

Exhibits

A Fieseler Fi 103R Reichenberg, a piloted version of the V-1 flying bomb.

The Focke-Achgelis Fa 330A-1 gyro-kite, used by U-boats for reconnaissance.

A Pickett-Hamilton Fort, a pop-up pillbox from World War II, was recently excavated from RAF Manston and restored.

The museum has a large collection of aircraft components and memorabilia.

External links 
Lashenden Air Warfare Museum

 

Aerospace museums in England
Museums in the Borough of Maidstone